The Bramor C4EYE is a tactical reconnaissance UAV classified as a NATO class 1 mini tactical drone with less than 5 kg MTOW. It was developed and built by C-Astral Aerospace Ltd from Ajdovščina in Slovenia.

It is equipped with an EO/IR/LI gyro-stabilized micro-gimbal with optical and infrared sensor, laser illuminator. The radio control and live audio / video transmission is carried over a MANET mesh network with AES encryption. The simultaneous transmission of metadata allows the integration of tactical data into situational awareness software suites (i.e. proprietary battle management system or Android Team Awareness Kit). It is also equipped with the latest generation of autopilot with GPS navigation system.

It can be used by 2 operators for surveillance and reconnaissance (ISR) missions, target acquisition ISTAR, close air support JTAC i.e. missions for special operations, convoy tracking, target detection, search and rescue, first aid missions, civil defense, infrastructure control and security missions.

The Bramor C4EYE has a basic operational radius of 42 km (extendable) and an endurance of 3.5 hours with daytime and nighttime flight capability.

Operational history 
The BRAMOR C4EYE UAS has been operational since mid-2010s.

Specifications (BRAMOR C4EYE) 

 & other payloads

Operators

External links
Official Manufacturer website
www.droneprovide.com

References 

Unmanned aerial vehicles of Slovenia